Rogues of Sherwood Forest is a 1950 Technicolor adventure film from Columbia Pictures, directed by Gordon Douglas, and starring John Derek as Robin, the Earl of Huntingdon, the son of Robin Hood, Diana Lynn as Lady Marianne, and Alan Hale, Sr. in his third Robin Hood film role as Little John during a 28-year period; he'd played the part opposite Douglas Fairbanks in 1922 and Errol Flynn in 1938, one of the longest periods over which a film actor played the same major character. It was also Hale's final film before his death. Rogues of Sherwood Forest was written by George Bruce and Ralph Gilbert Bettison. The supporting cast features George Macready as King John, Billy House as Friar Tuck and John Dehner in an early appearance as Sir Baldric, billed fourteenth in the cast list.

Plot
In this take on history, evil King John resumes his old ways following the death of Richard the Lionheart. His plan is to retain his power by importing Continental mercenaries and paying them through his old ploy: oppressive taxation. King John first attempts to kill the son of longtime nemesis, Robin Hood. His henchmen fix a faulty protective cap to the Flemish Knight's lance, who has challenged Robin, the Earl of Huntingdon, to a joust. Surviving the lance attack, he challenges the Flemish Knight to joust without using protective devices, successfully impaling his opponent.

Having returned from the Crusades, Robin and Little John once again recruit the now aging Merrie Men, who wage a successful guerrilla-type war throughout the realm. They cleverly use intelligence provided by messages attached to Lady Marianne's carrier pigeons to aid them in their successful campaign to defeat King John.

Robin and the Archbishop of Canterbury are able to compel the defeated King John to seal Magna Carta, establishing the rights of all Englishmen.

Cast
 John Derek as Robin Hood
 Diana Lynn as Lady Marianne de Beaudray
 George Macready as King John
 Alan Hale, Sr. as Little John
 Paul Cavanagh as Sir Giles
 Lowell Gilmore as Count of Flanders
 Billy House as Friar Tuck
 Lester Matthews as Alan-a-Dale
 Billy Bevan as Will Scarlet (billed as William Bevan)
 Wilton Graff as Baron Fitzwalter
 Donald Randolph as Archbishop Stephen Langton
 John Goldsworthy as Clyde
 Lumsden Hare as Warwick 
 John Dehner as Sir Baldric
 Olaf Hytten as Charcoal Burner (uncredited)

Production
The film was known as Swords of Sherwood Forrest.

Gig Young was the first choice to play the role of Prince John, but he was suspended by Columbia Pictures when he refused the part. The film was photographed in Technicolor, with location shooting being shot at Southern California's Corriganville Movie Ranch.

Critical reception
Leonard Maltin wrote: "Despite good production and fair cast, pretty limp". DVD Talk found it "a good programmer that makes a decent family film for a rainy Sunday afternoon, or anytime for classic film fans. Highly recommended".

Notes

External links
 
 
 
 

1950 films
1950s adventure drama films
Robin Hood films
Films directed by Gordon Douglas
Columbia Pictures films
American adventure drama films
Films scored by Mario Castelnuovo-Tedesco
Films scored by Heinz Roemheld
1950s historical adventure films
American historical adventure films
Films set in England
1950 drama films
1950s English-language films
1950s American films